Kirovsky District may refer to:
Kirovskyi District, Donetsk
Kirawsk Raion (Kirovsky District), a district of Mogilev Oblast, Belarus
Kirovsky District, Russia, several districts and city districts in Russia
Kirovske Raion (Kirovsky District), a district in Crimea
Kirovsky City District, Novosibirsk
Kirov Raion (disambiguation)

See also
Kirovsky (disambiguation)

District name disambiguation pages